The 1999 Hong Kong Women's Sevens was the second Hong Kong Women's Sevens to be held. It took place between the 22–24 March 1999. Fiji were meant to attend but didn't hence only two teams in Pool C.

Pool stages

Pool A

Pool B

Pool C

Pool D

Knockout stage

Plate

Cup

References

1999
1999 rugby sevens competitions
1999 in women's rugby union
Rugby union
1999 in Asian rugby union